The Uda is a river in the Buryat Republic, Russia. It is a right tributary of the Selenga, which it meets near the city Ulan-Ude.

The Uda basin lies in the Tuguro-Chumikanskiy region. The word Uda is derived from the Yakut word ud, meaning "milk". The name was conferred on the river owing to a nearby milk-colored lake.

Fish
The Uda is a prime habitat for the pink, chum, red, and coho salmons. Other fish species found in the Uda include the Siberian taimen, two forms of lenok, and Amur grayling. The river is especially important as it remains one of the last strongholds of taimen, which have dwindled in other Siberian rivers. Taimens grow to huge sizes here; specimens weighing  have been caught here.

See also
Selenga Highlands
List of rivers of Russia

References

Rivers of Buryatia